Lucy Suazo Pérez (born August 16, 1981 in San Cristóbal) is a female volleyball player from the Dominican Republic, who played with the women's national team at the 2002 World Championship in Germany. Her team finished in the 13th place. She played for her native country, wearing the #6 jersey.

Suazo played as Libero for Universidad de Burgos in the 2008-2009 season.

Clubs
 Los Cachorros (1990)
 Los Cachorros (1992)
 Granada (2000)
 Los Cachorros (2001)
 Cronos Alcobendas (2007-2008)
 Universidad de Burgos (2008-2009)
 GH Voley Ecay (2009-2010)

References

External links
 FIVB Profile

1981 births
Living people
Dominican Republic women's volleyball players
Liberos
Expatriate volleyball players in Spain
Dominican Republic expatriate sportspeople in Spain